Hemaben Acharya  is a leader of the Bharatiya Janata Party. She was Health minister in Government of Gujarat from 1975 to 1980. She represented Junagadh (Vidhan Sabha constituency) in the Gujarat Legislative Assembly.

References

State cabinet ministers of Gujarat
Bharatiya Jana Sangh politicians
People from Junagadh district
Women in Gujarat politics
Living people
Gujarat MLAs 1975–1980
20th-century Indian women politicians
20th-century Indian politicians
Women state cabinet ministers of India
Bharatiya Janata Party politicians from Gujarat
Year of birth missing (living people)